Eva Maler is a German born playwright, currently living in London.

Career
Maler was producer for Black Mark for Eagle Films.
Maler has appeared in various plays (including Mobile Talks) as well as a short film and several pieces of performance art.
Maler was an associate with blank pages theatre company.
Maler was assistant director for HuRica Productions's radio adaptation of Cleaner.

Bibliography
 If I Was To Speak..., first performed as a piece of Guerilla theatre alongside London's South Bank in 2008.
 Mission Impursable.
 Shared Accommodation (co-written with Hugh Allison), filmed in 2010 by HuRica Productions.
 small worlds.

References

External links 
 www.wix.com/evamaler/evamaler
 

Living people
1988 births
German stage actresses
German women dramatists and playwrights
21st-century German dramatists and playwrights
21st-century German actresses
German expatriates in England
21st-century German women writers